The National Conference Students' Union (NCSU) is the student wing of the Jammu & Kashmir National Conference party, established on 21 July 2012. The organisation was founded by Omar Abdullah working president of the National Conference.

See also
 Jammu & Kashmir National Conference
 Jammu & Kashmir Youth National Conference
 Lists of political parties

References

External links
 official Jammu and Kashmir National Conference website

Student wings of political parties in India